LaVar RaShad Arrington (born June 30, 1978) is a former American football linebacker who played in the National Football League (NFL) for seven seasons. He played college football at Penn State and was drafted second overall by the Washington Redskins of the 2000 NFL Draft. He was also a member of the New York Giants.

Early years
Arrington was born in Pittsburgh, Pennsylvania. He played linebacker and running back at North Hills Senior High School in Pittsburgh.  After his senior year, he was named the 1996 Parade National Player of the Year, Bobby Dodd National High School Back of the Year the Gatorade Player of the Year and USA Today Pennsylvania Player of the Year.  He became the second player in Pennsylvania Class 4-A history to rush for more than 4,000 career yards, with 4,357 on 711 carries and 72 touchdowns.  He played in the 1997 Big 33 Football Classic, the annual game between Pennsylvania and Ohio's best high school football players. In basketball, he was recruited to play basketball for Georgetown, UMass, and North Carolina.

Also a standout sprinter, Arrington was on the school's track & field team, where he recorded personal-best times of 10.85 seconds in the 100 meters and 23.14 seconds in the 200 meters. He also had top-jumps of 1.96 meters in the high jump and 6.76 meters in the long jump.

He was inducted into the WPIAL Hall of Fame on June 24, 2011.

College career
While attending Penn State University, Arrington played for coach Joe Paterno's Penn State Nittany Lions football team from 1997 to 1999.  His signature play with the Nittany Lions came during a game against Illinois.  On a fourth and short yardage play, Arrington anticipated the snap count and jumped over the offensive line to tackle the runner in the backfield.  The play became known as "The LaVar Leap".  Arrington's tendency for spectacular plays and his cover appearance on the Sports Illustrated 1999 College Football Preview Issue led many to mention him as a possible Heisman Trophy candidate.  Arrington received several honors during his college career, including the Chuck Bednarik Award, Dick Butkus Award, and Lambert Award in 1999.  He was an All-Big-Ten selection, a first-team All-American in 1998, and a consensus first-team All-American in 1999.  Arrington finished ninth in balloting for the 1999 Heisman Trophy.  He left Penn State after his junior season to enter the NFL draft.

On December 11, 2014 the Big Ten Network included Arrington on "The Mount Rushmore of Penn State Football", as chosen by online fan voting. Arrington was joined in the honor by John Cappelletti, Jack Ham, and Shane Conlan.

Professional career

Washington Redskins
After four seasons with the Redskins, Arrington signed an eight-year, $68 million contract extension. His agent Carl Poston was accused of neglecting to inspect the final revision of the contract, in which $6.5 million worth of bonuses contained in earlier drafts were missing. Poston was eventually suspended for two years by the National Football League Players' Association (NFLPA) over the mishandling of Arrington's contract; Arrington did not support the NFLPA's decision. Arrington's final two seasons with the Redskins was marred by knee injuries and conflicts with coaches Joe Gibbs and Gregg Williams. In March 2006 Arrington paid the Redskins $4.4 million to buy his free agency.

New York Giants
In April 2006, Arrington agreed to a seven-year, $49 million contract with the New York Giants.  He was injured in week 7 against the Dallas Cowboys and missed the rest of the season with a ruptured Achilles tendon. On February 12, 2007, he was released by the New York Giants.

Motorcycle accident and retirement
Arrington's agent Kevin Poston initially stated that his client intended to play during the 2007 NFL season, saying "things could change at some point, but as of this moment LaVar is focused on playing this season." 

However, on June 18, 2007, Arrington was involved in a serious motorcycle accident in suburban Maryland.  He was on the Route 50 off-ramp of the Capital Beltway when he lost control of his 2007 Kawasaki Ninja ZX-14, striking a guardrail. Arrington was rushed to Prince George's Medical Center, in serious but stable condition. Arrington sustained a broken right forearm, broken lower vertebrae, and deep cuts to his leg. He was issued two citations, one for failure to control speed to avoid a collision, the other for operating a vehicle without a class license that contributed to a crash. A September 23, 2007, New York Daily News article confirmed his retirement.

Career statistics

Regular season

After football

Broadcasting career
Arrington started working on pregame and postgame shows for Comcast SportsNet before the Redskins' 2007 season week 3 loss to the Giants. He became a permanent member of the Comcast team on October 14 for the Green Bay Packers game.

He returned to Comcast SportsNet's on-air lineup for week 3 of the 2008 NFL season, appearing on the pregame and postgame shows, and on Washington Post Live. Comcast also featured a segment entitled "Life on the Sidelines with LaVar Arrington" during its Redskins Kickoff program on game days.

Arrington did a weekday afternoon radio talk show in Washington, DC with DJ Chad Dukes, titled "The LaVar Arrington Show with Chad Dukes."  The inaugural show aired on July 20, 2009, on 106.7 The Fan.  He also hosts his own weekly sports show titled "SportsWeek with Lavar Arrington" on local Washington television station DC50.

On July 10, 2014, it was announced that Arrington would be joining NFL Network's NFL AM program.

In 2019 Arrington began working as a football analyst on FS1 on the "Speak For Yourself" sports talk program.

Entrepreneurship 
Arrington formed a sports agency, Leap Management, LLC, in 2008. The firm's first clients were 2009 NFL Draft prospects Aaron Maybin, Derrick Williams, Josh Gaines, and Tyrell Sales.

Arrington founded Xtreme Procision (XP) in 2010, a state-of-the-art football training system aimed at developing the world's next generation of football players. Xtreme Procision offers football training camps nationwide, as well as football training products with visual target zones to aid in accelerating development.

Personal
LaVar Arrington was named after LeVar Burton, following the actor's portrayal of Kunta Kinte in the 1977 television miniseries Roots. He has an older brother, Michael, who played basketball at Slippery Rock University and a younger brother, Eric. His father, Michael, became an ordained minister after he retired from the military. His mother, Carolyn, is a special education teacher in the Pittsburgh public school system. Arrington lives in Los Angeles County, California with his wife Trishia. The couple have four children.

Arrington opened a restaurant named The Sideline in Landover, Maryland on January 30, 2008.  In March 2009 one man was killed and six other people were injured after an argument ended in a burst of gunfire just outside the main entrance to the restaurant.  The restaurant went bankrupt and closed in December 2009.

Arrington appeared in several television commercials for Eastern Motors with fellow athletes Carmelo Anthony, Clinton Portis, Sean Taylor, and Antawn Jamison.  He appeared on a 2002 episode of the TLC program While You Were Out, where he helped redesign a room for his brother, Michael.  Arrington served as a judge for ESPN's Dream Job.

References

External links
Official NFL Player Page
Leap Management, LLC  website
"Arrington gives first interview after near-fatal crash", New York Daily News, September 23, 2007
"Arrington tutors protégé Bowman", The Daily Collegian, October 14, 2008
"LaVar Arrington's Complete Athlete – Empowering the Next Generation", Career Ahead Magazine, February 2021

1978 births
Living people
All-American college football players
American football linebackers
American sports radio personalities
National Conference Pro Bowl players
New York Giants players
Penn State Nittany Lions football players
Players of American football from Pittsburgh
Washington Redskins players